Gjesvær is an old fishing village in Nordkapp Municipality in Troms og Finnmark county, Norway.  It is the only place in Finnmark known from the Viking Age and is mentioned in the Heimskringla saga as Geirsver.  The name comes from the name of a bird called geirfugl.

The location was used by Vikings on the way to Bjarmaland (see Ottar from Hålogaland), and probably also for gathering food on the nearby Gjesværstappan islands which contain one of the largest seabird colonies in Norway.

Like most other places in Finnmark, all buildings in the village were burned down in 1944 by the German occupying forces.  Gjesvær Chapel, built in 1960, is considered a cultural monument.

Gjesvær has approximately 100 inhabitants, but at the beginning of the 1970s, it had about 350 people. It has a fish processing plant, local shop, post office, and primary school. The main industry is fishing, but in recent years there has been an increased emphasis on tourism, activities including fishing and bird watching trips to the Gjesværstappan nature reserve.

Gjesvær was historically a part of Måsøy Municipality, along with the sparsely populated western part of Magerøya island. There were no road connections across the island, so residents traveled by boat whenever they left the village and by boat, they are closer to Måsøy. For this reason, the municipal boundary was moved. On 1 January 1984, Gjesvær and the western part of Magerøya were transferred from Måsøy municipality to Nordkapp Municipality.

References

External links

Magerøya
Nordkapp
Villages in Finnmark